is a 1993 strategy video game developed and published by Irem exclusively in Japan for the Nintendo Game Boy on July 30, 1993. It features characters from four of Irem's franchises: R-Type, Mr. Heli, Ninja Spirit, and Hammerin' Harry.

External links
Shuyaku Sentai Irem Fighter at Digital Monkey Box
Shuyaku Sentai Irem Fighter page on the Select Button Wiki.

1993 video games
Crossover video games
Irem games
Game Boy-only games
Japan-exclusive video games
Game Boy games
Video games developed in Japan